Sector3 Studios (formerly SimBin Studios) is a Swedish video game developer and publisher founded in 2003 that develops racing simulators for Windows PC. The company has its headquarters in Lidköping. The company originally started as a modding team for the Image Space Incorporated game F1 2002, releasing a mod based on the 2002 season of the FIA GT championship, Essentially the precursor to its first commercial game.

The company has released GTR - FIA GT Racing Game, GT Legends, a sequel to GTR Racing called GTR - FIA GT Racing Game 2, all published by 10tacle as well as RACE - The Official WTCC Game published by Eidos Interactive and RACE 07 - The Official WTCC Game which was the first SimBin game to include Formula cars. RACE 07 has gone on to have seven expansion packs released for it: GTR Evolution, STCC - The Game, Race On, STCC The Game 2, GT Power Expansion, WTCC 2010 and Retro Expansion. Although the company mainly focuses on racing simulators for Windows, Race Pro was developed for the Xbox 360 console, published by Atari and released in February 2009. In May 2009 SimBin released Volvo – The Game as a freeware for Windows. It included six cars, two racetracks and a time trial mode. Cars include the Volvo S60, Volvo S40 and Volvo 850. In 2012, SimBin released RaceRoom Racing Experience, a new free to play game that connects fans of racing around a game, motorsports portal and online store.

On September 1, 2014, SimBin Studios officially changed their name to Sector3 Studios, as part of a company restructuring. The name was changed primarily because the former was contractually tied to the location, and the team wanted to move to a more populous area.

Games developed

Games published

References

External links 
 

Lidköping
Companies based in Västra Götaland County
Video game companies established in 2003
Video game companies of Sweden
Video game development companies
Swedish companies established in 2003